Violet Crumble is an Australian chocolate bar. The bar is a crumbly honeycomb toffee centre coated in a layer of compound chocolate. It was first made by Hoadley's Chocolates in South Melbourne around the year 1913; and is currently made in Adelaide, South Australia by Robern Menz after a period of ownership by Nestlé. Its advertising slogan is "It's the way it shatters that matters", and previously was "Nothing else matters". The bar shares similarities to the Crunchie bar made by British firm Cadbury. Aside from Australia, it is common in Hawaii and a selection of other places, such as Hong Kong and Mollie Stone's Markets in California. They can also be found in some import speciality stores such as Cost Plus World Market in the United States.

History 

Abel Hoadley opened a jam factory in South Melbourne, in 1889, trading as A. Hoadley & Company. By 1895, business had expanded rapidly and Hoadley built a five-storey premises, the Rising Sun Preserving Works. He produced jams, jellies, fruit preserves, candied peels, sauces, and confectionery and employed a workforce as large as 200. By 1901, there were four preserving factories and a large confectionery works. Hoadley had acquired the firm of Dillon, Burrows & Co and extended his products to vinegar, cocoa, and chocolate. In 1910, the jam business was sold to Henry Jones Co-operative and in 1913, Hoadley's Chocolates was formed.

The same year, Hoadley produced his first chocolate assortment and packed them in a purple box decorated with violets. The packaging was in tribute to his wife's favorite colour (purple) and favorite flower (violets). Within the box assortment was a piece of honeycomb that became so popular that Hoadley decided to produce an individual honeycomb bar.

This proved trickier than first thought because as the pieces of honeycomb cooled, they absorbed moisture and started sticking together. This hygroscopic nature of honeycomb led Hoadley to eventually dip his bars in chocolate, to keep the honeycomb dry and crunchy. Thus, in 1913, the Violet Crumble bar was created.

Hoadley wanted to call his new bar just Crumble but learned that it was not possible to protect the name with a trademark. He thought of his wife (Susannah Ann née Barrett) and her favourite flower, the violet, and registered the name Violet Crumble, using a purple wrapper with a small flower logo. It was an instant success. Violet Crumbles are crispier in texture than Crunchie bars, with a slightly more marshmallow taste.

Hoadley's Chocolates was acquired by English company Rowntree's in 1970, who produced Violet Crumble in Adelaide until 1985. Rowntree's was itself acquired in 1988 by Nestlé, who moved production to the northern Melbourne suburb of Campbellfield.

On 11 January 2018, Robern Menz purchased the Violet Crumble brand and its associated intellectual property, plant and equipment for an undisclosed sum, and production began on 10 October 2018.

Timeline
1913, Hoadley's Chocolates made the first Violet Crumble bar in Melbourne.
1972, Hoadley's Chocolates was acquired by Rowntree's and became known as Rowntree Hoadley Ltd.
1989, Nestlé acquired Rowntree's. The Rowntree chocolate brands were initially branded as Nestlé-Rowntree until Nestlé dropped the Rowntree altogether.
2009, Nestlé changed the shape of the Violet Crumble to a wider, flatter bar. The honeycomb formulation was also changed to make it shatter into small pieces when bitten into.
2010, Nestlé included Violet Crumble bags on their list of deleted products
2012, an attempt at regaining name and recipe rights for the Violet Crumble was made by young entrepreneur Bryan Hoadley, a descendant of Abel Hoadley.
2018, in January Robern Menz announced their plans to acquire the rights and equipment to take over production and commenced production in October.
2019, in March bags of Violet Crumble went on sale, for the first time in nine years, in independent grocery stores such as IGA.

Packaging
The hygroscopic nature of the honeycomb centre was problematic. Competitors tried to prove the bars were not fresh by squeezing them. Hoadley responded by instituting a strict coding system to keep track of the shelf life (12 months) and ensure that only the freshest bars were sold. In addition, he searched worldwide for a new type of airtight wrapper that would keep the bar fresh. Eventually, a French company, La Cellophane, invented a moisture-resistant metallised cellophane especially for Violet Crumble.

Production
The honeycomb is produced and conveyed into an air-conditioned area where it is cut into bars. Then it goes through chocolate coating machines. The bars are double-coated to seal the honeycomb from the air. Cooling tunnels take the bars to the automatic wrapping machines.

Bertie Beetle, a small chocolate candy sold at stores and various shows (Royal and otherwise) around Australia, were invented to use up broken pieces of Violet Crumble.

See also
Crunchie – a competing product made by Cadbury
 List of chocolate bar brands
 List of confectionery brands

References

External links

Rowntree's brands
Nestlé brands
Chocolate bars
Australian confectionery
Australian snack foods